Joseph-Nestor Duguay (March 15, 1846 – March 17, 1907) was a businessman and political figure in Quebec. He represented Yamaska in the Legislative Assembly of Quebec from 1874 to 1875 as a Conservative.

He was born in Baie-du-Febvre, Canada East, the son of Joseph Duguay and Anne-Scholastique-Olive Beauchemin, and was educated at the Collège de Nicolet. Duguay was one of the pioneers of the dairy industry in the Yamaska region and owned a number of cheese-making facilities. He was married three times: to Marie-Éméline Davis in 1866, then to Marie-Nina Davis, his first wife's sister, in 1877 and finally to Émiline Lacerte in 1905. Duguay was mayor of Saint-Zéphirin-de-Courval from 1875 to 1876. He ran unsuccessfully for reelection to the Quebec assembly in 1890. Duguay died at Baie-du-Febvre at the age of 61.

References
 

1846 births
1907 deaths
Conservative Party of Quebec MNAs
Mayors of places in Quebec